The Journal of Ayn Rand Studies (JARS) is an academic journal devoted to the study of Objectivism, the philosophy of Ayn Rand. Established in 1999, its founding co-editors were R. W. Bradford, Stephen D. Cox, and Chris Matthew Sciabarra. At present, the editorial board consists of Cox, Sciabarra, Robert L. Campbell, and Roderick Long. Since 2013, the journal has been published by Penn State University Press. Although the Objectivist movement has been criticized as being a cult of personality, The Journal of Ayn Rand Studies often publishes papers by mainstream intellectuals and academics from prestigious universities worldwide that approach Rand's legacy without hagiography.

The Journal of Ayn Rand Studies is published twice a year. Occasionally, it publishes special issues.

Controversy
In 2002, philosopher Andrew Bernstein, who is intellectually affiliated with the Ayn Rand Institute, contributed a brief reply to a review of the CliffsNotes for Ayn Rand's novels. He subsequently issued an apology for having contributed to the journal. Bernstein wrote, "I deeply regret my thoughtless decision to contribute to this journal, and hereby irrevocably repudiate any and all association with it", and asserted that the journal was "filled with writings by people with whom I refuse to knowingly associate under any circumstances." In 2007, the Department of Philosophy at Texas State University turned down a grant from the Anthem Foundation to support a visiting faculty position that would specialize in Objectivism. Bernstein was a candidate to fill the position. According to Rebecca Raphael, a Senior Lecturer in Philosophy at Texas State, Bernstein's apology for publishing in the journal indicated that the Anthem Foundation was expecting the person hired to meet an "ideological litmus test." According to reporter David Glenn, "When asked by The Chronicle about his 2002 comments, Mr. Bernstein replied that rejecting The Journal of Ayn Rand Studies was a moral and intellectual obligation."

References

External links 
 

Biannual journals
English-language journals
Penn State University Press academic journals
Rand, Ayn
Publications established in 1999
Rand, Ayn
Works about Ayn Rand
Works about Objectivism (Ayn Rand)